Kerak telor is a Betawi traditional spicy omelette dish in Indonesian cuisine. It is made from glutinous rice cooked with egg and served with serundeng (fried shredded coconut), fried shallots and dried shrimp as topping. It is considered as a snack and not as a main dish. The vendors of kerak telor are easily the most ubiquitous during annual Jakarta Fair and it has also become a must-have menu item for visitors at the event.

Ingredients and method
Each of the portion is made by order. The kerak telor vendor puts a small amount of ketan on a small wok pan and heats it on the charcoal fire. He then adds an egg (chicken or duck, but duck eggs are considered more delicious), and some spices and mix it. The dish is fried on a wok without any cooking oil so the omelette will stick on the wok and enable to put it upside down straight against charcoal fire until it is cooked. The spicy serundeng (sweet grated coconut granule) with ebi (dried salted shrimp) and fried shallots are sprinkled upon the omelette.

History
In the Colonial era, kerak telor was a privileged food and was served in big parties for the colonial government or rich Betawi. According to gastronomy expert Suryatini N. Ganie, kerak telor was created in order to make glutinous rice more tasty and satisfying.
In modern day, kerak telor vendors no longer dominated by native Jakartans, some of them come from Padang, Tegal, Garut and Cimahi.

See also

 List of Indonesian cuisine

References

External links

 Kerak telor recipe on cookingrecipesguide.org
 Interview with Kerak telor vendor
 Kerak telor making on Youtube

Indonesian cuisine
Omelettes
Betawi cuisine
Foods containing coconut
Street food in Indonesia
Rice dishes